Neil Bennett (born 22 August 1971) is a Scottish former footballer who played as a defender for Berwick Rangers and Livingston.

Career

Playing career
Bennett started his career at St Johnstone but left the club in 1991 without having made a first team appearance at McDiarmid Park.

He signed for Alloa in 1991 and made 115 appearances over a 5 year spell at the club.

The defender then signed for Stirling Albion in 1995 and scored 7 goals in 71 appearances at Forthbank Stadium.

Bennett signed for Livingston in 1998 and was part of the squad that won the 1998–99 Scottish Second Division.  He found regular game time hard to come by at Livi due to big investment in the playing staff and incoming seasoned pro's being signed and keeping him out of the team.

After departing from the Almondvale Stadium, Bennett signed for Montrose in 2000 and played 16 in a short spell at the club before re-signing for Stirling Albion later in that year.  The defender appeared 21 times for the Binos during the remainder of the 2000-2001 season.

He was on the move again in 2001, this time signing for Berwick Rangers.  He remained at Shielfield Park for 3 years, scoring 7 goals in 76 appearances for the Wee Gers.

Bennett had a spell at Linlithgow Rose before retiring from playing.

Honours
 Livingston
Scottish Football League Second Division : 1998-99

References

External links
Neil Bennett on Soccerbase

1971 births
Living people
Scottish footballers
Scottish Football League players
Association football defenders
Livingston F.C. players
St Johnstone F.C. players
Alloa Athletic F.C. players
Stirling Albion F.C. players
Montrose F.C. players
Berwick Rangers F.C. players
Linlithgow Rose F.C. players
Footballers from Falkirk
Scottish Junior Football Association players